Jessica Hansen (born 30 June 1995) is an Australian swimmer. She competed in the women's 100 metre breaststroke event at the 2017 World Aquatics Championships. Hansen studied a Bachelor of Exercise Sport Science/Business (Sports Management) degree at Deakin University.

References

External links
 

1995 births
Living people
People educated at Carey Baptist Grammar School
World Aquatics Championships medalists in swimming
Australian female breaststroke swimmers
Swimmers at the 2018 Commonwealth Games
Commonwealth Games competitors for Australia
Swimmers at the 2020 Summer Olympics
Olympic swimmers of Australia
20th-century Australian women
21st-century Australian women